Jagged Little Pill, Live is a video chronicling Alanis Morissette's Jagged Little Pill world tour from 1995 to 1996.  It was primarily filmed in New Orleans, Louisiana, United States, but it features clips from various other tour stops, including Morissette's hometown of Ottawa, Ontario, Canada. All of the Jagged Little Pill album is featured on this release.

The video won a Grammy Award for "Best Long Form Music Video".

Track listing
"Welcome the Charmed Ones I'm Sure" – 1:19
"All I Really Want" – 5:45
"The Craziness" – 3:06
"Right Through You" – 3:13
"Sexual Chocolate Intros" – 1:53
"Not the Doctor" – 6:24
"Synergy" – 0:36
"Hand in My Pocket" – 4:58
"Enuf About Me" – 2:33
"10 Feathers" – 0:21
"Head over Feet" – 5:05
"Mary Jane" – 6:02
"He Would for Someone" – 1:18
"Forgiven" – 5:36
"Spotless Pseudo Home" – 0:13
"Perfect" – 3:55
"Release Not Revenge" – 1:08
"You Oughta Know" – 5:14
"Wake Up" – 7:38
"Explosion of Blueness" – 1:59
"Ironic" – 4:23
"Under Arrest" – 0:13
"You Learn" – 7:42
"Your House" – 4:11
"No Pressure over Cappuccino/The Culprits" – 2:08

Personnel
Alanis Morissette – vocals, harmonica, guitar
Chris Chaney – bass
Taylor Hawkins – drums, percussion
Nick Lashley – guitar, background vocals
Jesse Tobias – guitar, background vocals

Certifications

References

Alanis Morissette video albums
Rockumentaries
Grammy Award for Best Long Form Music Video
1997 video albums